Asher Clark (born February 11, 1990) is an American former college football running back for the Air Force Academy football program.

Clark was born and raised in Lawrenceville, Georgia, in 1990.  In January 2008, he committed to the United States Air Force Academy after receiving a football scholarship. He had been a quarterback in high school and was converted to a tailback at Air Force.  He gained 588 rushing yards as a freshman in 2008, 865 yards as a sophomore in 2009, and 1,031 yards as a junior in 2010.  During the 2011 season, Clark totaled 1,110 rushing yards on 163 carries for an average of 6.8 yards per carry.

By the end of the 2011 season, Clark ranked as the second leading rusher in Air Force Academy history. He was removed from the Air Force Academy in May 2012, less than one week before he was due to graduate.

References

External links
Air Force Academy biography

1990 births
Living people
People from Suwanee, Georgia
Sportspeople from the Atlanta metropolitan area
Players of American football from Georgia (U.S. state)
American football running backs
Air Force Falcons football players